Léon Mébiame (1 September 1934 – 18 December 2015) was a Gabonese politician who was the 2nd Prime Minister of Gabon. From 1975 to 1990, he served as the longest-serving Prime Minister in Gabonese history, at 15 years and 17 days.

Life and career
A member of the Fang ethnic group, Mébiame was born in Libreville. Under French colonial rule, he became an inspector of federal police in 1956 and was posted in Chad from 6 January 1957 to March 1959. At independence in 1960, he was commissioner of police. A close associate of President Omar Bongo, he was Vice President of Gabon from 1968 to 1975, when the position was abolished; he was then appointed as Prime Minister and served from 16 April 1975 to 3 May 1990. He was the minister of public finance from 1990 to 1991.
Subsequently, he joined the opposition in the early 1990s.

He was appointed as President of the Libreville Chamber of Commerce, Industry, and Mines on 6 November 2008. He took office on 4 December 2008, succeeding Joachim Boussamba. He was also appointed to the Economic and Social Council, an official advisory body, by President Bongo in 2008, although he lost his seat on the council after Bongo's son Ali Bongo Ondimba took office in 2009.

Mébiame died at age 81 at a Libreville clinic on the night of 17–18 December 2015.

References

Vice presidents of Gabon
Prime Ministers of Gabon
Finance ministers of Gabon
2015 deaths
1934 births
21st-century Gabonese people